Cecil P. "Buddy" Hall (born May 29, 1945, in Metropolis, Illinois) has been an American professional pool player for three decades and is considered one of the best nine-ball players of all time. The International Pool Tour heralds Hall as a "living pool legend." He is nicknamed "The Rifleman" for his accuracy  and had been a consistent top player for over two decades and virtually unbeaten when playing "money matches".

Many players and pundits consider him to be one of the most fundamentally solid 9-Ball players of all time, heralding him with the best cue ball control of any player. 

Hall has been credited for creating the "clock system" which is a technique for where to hit the cue-ball, using the clock as a mechanism for where to aim.

Hall began playing at 14 years of age in a soda shop in his home town. When local pool rooms would not let him enter because of his age, he used subterfuge to obtain a new birth certificate from a local judge which stated he was of legal age. He cut his teeth at Herbie Lynn's pool room and was soon dominating the regulars. It was not long before he hit the road to try his hand at a wider playing field. After watching all the great players, he first gained some prominence when he entered the Johnston City tournament in 1970 and beating some top players."I went there to watch all the greats of the day play.  Wimpy, Jersey Red, Eddie Taylor, Cornbread Red, Harold Worst, Jimmy Moore, Fats and U.J. were playing one another in both the tournament and in backroom ring games. I  entered and was very pleased when I beat Wimpy and Jersey Red and won my entry fee back."

In the following years, Johnston City lost out as the hub of top tier tournament play to the Dayton Open Tournament. There, in 1974 organizer Joe Burns instituted a similar all-around tournament to the format that had been used in the Johnston City Tournament. He took All-Around first place there in 1974 winning $6,800 and after continued to complete in the Dayton Open Tournaments for many years. In 1982 Buddy won the Caesar's Tahoe Nine-ball Championship by edging out Allen Hopkins in the final with a score of 11–6, winning $35,000 for his efforts; the biggest first prize money in a tournament at the time. Hall had an ESPN's announcement of his win, which was the first ever mention of a billiard player on that cable television network. "The Rifleman" won a considerable amount of 9-Ball tournaments that were held from the 1970s through to the 2000s. In 1995 'Rags to Rifleman' was published, a biography of his life and career.

Career
Buddy Hall is a winner of over 100 professional tournaments in pocket billiards. In 1974 Hall won one of his first events in the Dayton Open all-around tournament. Hall later in his career went on to win the U.S. Open 9-Ball Championship in 1991, 1998. On his road to victory of the 1991 U.S. Open 9-ball Championship, in the semi finals, Buddy after trailing 7-1 behind against Johnny Archer, ran 8 consecutive racks in a row to win the match. Archer later stated on a TAR Podcast that Buddy in the game of Nine-ball was: "The best I've ever seen, the best I've ever played". Hall  was the thirty ninth inductee in the Billiards Congress of America's Hall of Fame, in the year 2000.  He was named Player of the Year by the pool media, to include Pro Billiards Tour, National Billiard News and the Billiards Digest Magazine, in 1982, 1991, 1997, 1998. A profile of Hall appeared in The Hustler column of the inaugural issue of The Snap Magazine, a story reputed to have "... in many ways set the tone for the magazine from there on out." He is a former member of the International Pool Tour and has later retired from professional competition although sometimes competes on various regional tours and senior events throughout the United States.

Career titles and achievements

References

American pool players
Living people
1945 births
People from Metropolis, Illinois